Margaret Hill may refer to:

People
 Margaret Hill (social reformer) (1885–1970), a British social reformer
 Margaret Hill (dancer) (1929–1975), British ballerina
 Margaret Hunt Hill (1915–2007), American heiress and philanthropist
 Margaret Hill McCarter (1860–1938), American teacher and novelist
 Margaret Hill Morris (1737–1816), Colonial American Quaker medical practitioner and diarist

Places
 Margaret Hill (Antarctica), a peak on Rucker Ridge, Victoria Land, Antarctica

See also
 Margaret Hills (1882–1967), British teacher and feminist

Hill, Margaret